The 1937–38 New York Americans season was the Americans' 13th season of play.

Offseason
The team played an exhibition game against the New York Rangers in Saskatoon, Saskatchewan 30 October to open the new Saskatoon Arena.

Regular season

Final standings

Record vs. opponents

Game log

Playoffs
They made it into the playoffs.  They defeated the Rangers in 3 games in a best of three series, or 2–1.  They went against the Black Hawks in a best of three series and got defeated in 3 games, or 1–2.

Player stats

Regular season
Scoring

Goaltending

Playoffs
Scoring

Goaltending

Awards and records

Transactions

See also
1937–38 NHL season

References

External links
 

New York Americans seasons
New York Americans
New York Americans
New York Amer
New York Amer
1930s in Manhattan
Madison Square Garden